T. aurea  may refer to:
 Tabebuia aurea, a plant species native to South America in Suriname, Brazil, eastern Bolivia, Peru, Paraguay and northern Argentina
 Tominanga aurea, a fish species endemic to Indonesia

See also
 Aurea (disambiguation)